Givat Harsina, also Ramat Mamre , is an Israeli settlement on the outskirts of the Palestinian city of Hebron, in the Judean Mountains region of the West Bank. Israel officially considers it part of the settlement of Kiryat Arba, and its population statistics are included with those of Kiryat Arba.

History
Givat Harsina was founded in 1979. The settlement was named after Colonel Aaron Harsina. It is also called Ramat Mamre because of its proximity to Mamre. Wadi al Ghrous is located in the heart of the Baqa'a Valley, a few kilometers east of Hebron City. It is sandwiched between the Israeli settlements Givat Harsina and Kiryat Arba.

The international community considers Israeli settlements in the West Bank illegal under international law, but the Israeli government disputes this.

References

External links
  גבעת חרסינה www.haaretz.co.il

Jews and Judaism in Hebron
Mixed Israeli settlements
1979 establishments in the Israeli Military Governorate
Populated places established in 1979
Israeli settlements in the West Bank

he:גבעת חרסינה